The Mountain Partnership is an official United Nations partnership and international voluntary alliance dedicated to improving the lives of mountain peoples and protecting mountain environments around the world.

History 

During the preparatory process of the World Summit on Sustainable Development in Johannesberg, South Africa, in 2002, the governments of Italy and Switzerland, the Food and Agriculture Organization (FAO), and the United Nations Environment Programme (UNEP) embarked on an effort to organize a new partnership to strengthen cooperation and more effectively address the needs of mountain peoples and environments around the world. As a result, the International Partnership for Sustainable Development of Mountain Regions, known as the Mountain Partnership, was launched.

Membership 

The Mountain Partnership currently has 370 members, comprising governments, intergovernmental organizations and major groups from civil society, NGOs and the private sector.

The following governments are currently members of the Mountain Partnership.
 
  Afghanistan
  Algeria
  Andorra
  Argentina 
  Armenia 
  Austria 
  Azerbaijan
  Bangladesh
  Bhutan 
  Bolivia 
  Burundi
  Cameroon 
  Chile 
  Colombia
  Costa Rica
  Cuba 
  Democratic Republic of Congo 
  Dominican Republic
  Ecuador 
  Ethiopia
  France 
  Georgia 
  Ghana
  Guatemala
  Guinea
  India
  Indonesia
  Iran
  Italy
  Jamaica
  Jordan
  Kenya
  Kyrgyzstan
  Lesotho
  Liechtenstein
  Madagascar
  Malawi
  Mexico
  Monaco
  Morocco
  Nepal
  North Macedonia
  Pakistan
  Papua New Guinea
  Peru
  Philippines
  Romania
  Serbia
  Slovakia
  Slovenia
  Spain
  Sri Lanka
  Swaziland
  Switzerland
  Togo
  Tunisia
  Turkey
  Uganda
  Ukraine
  Venezuela
  Yemen

Organization 

The Mountain Partnership is supported by a secretariat based at the FAO in Rome, Italy. The secretariat plays a facilitating role, connecting institutions and helping members develop joint activities to protect mountain regions.

Work 

The work of the Mountain Partnership is spread out among four pillars, namely: advocacy, communications, brokering initiatives and capacity development. The Mountain Partnership works to bring global attention to achieving sustainable development in mountain regions and to promote the inclusion of mountain issues in United Nations declarations and other international documents. Members also engage in disseminating awareness with regards to challenges faced by mountain peoples and environments. Furthermore, the Mountain Partnership’s role is to "facilitate contacts between countries and institutions and creating conditions for partnerships, technical cooperation and resource mobilization at all levels". The scope of the Mountain Partnership is for members to cooperate in order to facilitate, promote and implement initiatives at all levels.

The Mountain Partnership’s main principles are "participation of all members, accountability, responsiveness, consensus, transparency and flexibility". Its Secretariat is crucial for the creation of an enabling environment for main actors to cooperate towards the obtainment of common aims.

In 2012, its members lobbied for sustainable mountain development to be included in The Future We Want, the final outcome document of the Rio+20 United Nations Conference on Sustainable Development, resulting in the inclusion of three paragraphs relating to mountains.
The partnership also encourages the development of policies and laws that give local mountain communities a voice in decision-making and organizes conferences, training sessions, workshops and communications materials on sustainable development in mountain areas worldwide.

On 11–13 December 2017, the Food and Agriculture Organization hosted the Fifth Global Meeting of the Mountain Partnership during which more than two hundred members participated. For this meeting, members renewed their commitments to protect mountains and their environments, to better the life of mountain peoples and to empower them. In addition, a four-year Governance and Strategy and two-year work plan were endorsed.

Thanks to advocacy efforts of the Mountain Partnership members, mountains are mentioned in three targets under two of the 17 goals issued by the Open Working Group on Sustainable Development Goals in its outcome document.

 By 2020 protect and restore water-related ecosystems, including mountains, forests, wetlands, rivers, aquifers and lakes
 By 2020 ensure conservation, restoration and sustainable use of terrestrial and inland freshwater ecosystems and their services, in particular forests, wetlands, mountains and drylands, in line with obligations under international agreements
 By 2030 ensure the conservation of mountain ecosystems, including their biodiversity, to enhance their capacity to provide benefits which are essential for sustainable development.

Selected publications

 Working together for mountain peoples and environments
 15 years of Mountain Partnership
 Tourism in Mountain Regions - Hopes, Fears and Realities
 Mountain Farming is Family Farming
 Mountains: Our Life, Our Future – Progress and perspectives on sustainable mountain development
 Mountain Forests in a Changing World
 Highlands and Drylands: Mountains, a Source of Resilience in Arid Regions
 Mountain Biodiversity and Global Change
 Mountains and Climate Change, from Understanding to Action

See also 

 International Mountain Society

References

External links 
Mountain Partnership website

International sustainability organizations
Mountains